Jean-Baptiste Claes (born 9 February 1937) is a Belgian racing cyclist. He rode in the 1961 Tour de France.

References

1937 births
Living people
Belgian male cyclists
Place of birth missing (living people)